Phyllis Margaret Linton (born 9 June 1929) is a British former swimmer. Linton competed in the women's 4 × 100 metre freestyle relay at the 1952 Summer Olympics. She won the 1950 and 1951 ASA National Championship 110 yards freestyle titles and the 1950 ASA National Championship 220 yards freestyle title.

References

External links
 

1929 births
Possibly living people
British female swimmers
Olympic swimmers of Great Britain
Swimmers at the 1952 Summer Olympics
Sportspeople from Newport, Wales